Duolar–Chevalmeire is a professional Belgian women's cycling team which participates in elite road races, and was established in 2019.

Team roster

Major results
2021
Schoonaarde Criterium, Lenny Druyts
GP Beerens–Ster van Aartselaar, Thalita de Jong
 Limburg Provincial Cyclo-cross Championships Limburg, Nathalie Bex

References

External links

UCI Women's Teams
Cycling teams based in Belgium
Cycling teams established in 2019